The 1962 Memphis State Tigers football team represented Memphis State College (now known as the University of Memphis) as an independent during the 1962 NCAA University Division football season. In its fifth season under head coach Billy J. Murphy, the team compiled an 8–1 record and outscored opponents by a total of 261 to 67. Jerry Bell and Wayne Evans were the team captains. The team played its home games at Crump Stadium in Memphis, Tennessee.

The team's statistical leaders included Russell Vollmer with 555 passing yards, fullback Dave Casinelli with 826 rushing yards and 66 points scored, and John Griffin with 220 receiving yards.

Schedule

References

Memphis State
Memphis Tigers football seasons
Memphis State Tigers football